Amphimallon pygiale is a species of beetle in the Melolonthinae subfamily that can be found in France and Spain.

References

Beetles described in 1846
pygiale
Beetles of Europe